Harry Preston Ilsley (December 7, 1884 – February 18, 1953) was an American jurist who served as a justice of the Wyoming Supreme Court from January 7, 1952, until his death.

Born in Markesan, Wisconsin, he was raised by an aunt and uncle because his parents died at an early age. He attended high school in Deadwood, South Dakota, and graduated from the University of South Dakota School of Law in June 1908. He was admitted to the South Dakota Bar and practiced law in Belle Fourche, South Dakota, until June 1910, when he moved to Sundance, Wyoming. He was admitted to the Wyoming State Bar and practiced law in Sundance until 1920, when Governor Robert D. Carey appointed him to serve as a Wyoming state district court judge. He served two years of an unexpired term and was then elected to five successive six-year terms. On January 7, 1952, Governor Frank A. Barrett appointed him to the Wyoming Supreme Court to fill the unexpired term of retiring Chief Justice of the Wyoming Supreme Court Ralph Kimball. In 1952, he was elected for a full six-year term on the Wyoming Supreme Court. He died in office on February 18, 1953. His son, John, practiced law in Gillette, Wyoming and later served as a district court judge on the Fourth Judicial District Court in Sheridan, Wyoming.

References

External links

|-

South Dakota lawyers
Justices of the Wyoming Supreme Court
1884 births
1953 deaths
University of South Dakota School of Law alumni
People from Markesan, Wisconsin
20th-century American judges
20th-century American lawyers